Cymindis interior is a species of ground beetle in the subfamily Harpalinae. It was described by Lindroth in 1969.

References

interior
Beetles described in 1969